Prek Cali (29 July 187225 March 1945) was an Albanian bajraktar ("standard-bearer") of Vermosh, part of the Kelmendi tribe of northern Albania. He was a veteran of the Albanian rebellions and the Balkan Wars. He was killed in 1945 by the Partisans.

Early life and rebellions
Cali was born in Vermosh, part of the Kelmendi tribe, at the time part of the Scutari Vilayet (now northern Albania). He became the bajraktar ("flag-bearer") of Kelmendi. He participated in the Albanian revolts of 1908 and 1911 (fighting at Deçiq) against the Ottomans. He then participated in the Balkan Wars. He led his tribe against Montenegrin forces.

After the fall of Fan S. Noli's cabinet (1928), Cali came in conflict with King Ahmet Zogu while trying to establish autonomy for the Kelmendi tribe within the state.

World War II

Plav and Gusinje 
At the beginning of World War II Prek Cali had between 200 and 1,200 armed men around Vermosh under his command. His forces took control over Plav and Gusinje in 1941, before Italian forces occupied it.

Cali participated in the Italian counter-offensive in August 1941, during the Uprising in Montenegro. Italian General Alessandro Pirzio Biroli reported that Albanian forces from Vermosh commanded by Cali supported Division Venezia that advanced from Podgorica to insurgent-controlled Kolašin and Andrijevica and re-occupied them despite fierce resistance. Many members of the Hasani/Hasanaj clan were sent to Piana degli Albanesi in Italy during that time where they now form a Muslim minority.

Cooperation with Chetniks 
Montenegrin Chetnik leader Pavle Đurišić was transferred to Plav in 1939, after Italian occupation of Albania, and was given a task to establish and maintain intelligence network to be used in case of Axis attack on Yugoslavia. This network was not much helpful during the Axis invasion of Yugoslavia but was successfully used for struggle against Communists in Montenegro and Albania. Pavle Đurišić successfully agreed on Prek Cali's support and bases for Chetniks on the territory of northern Albania, Plav and Gusinje. According to Rudolf Perhinek, Prek Cali was politically opposed to the Muslims from Kosovo and he openly admitted that he used Cali to inspire conflicts between Catholics and Muslims in northern Albania. Prek Cali invited Chetnik officer Marko Vučeljić to have a meeting in Vermosh, which was accepted, Vučeljić sent his brother Tomo to meet with him above Vermosh. Chetnik captain Marko Vučeljić established Chetnik military base in Vermosh. In 1943, Chetnik leader Draža Mihailović paid Cali for his services and also delivered him some arms.

Prek Cali became a blood brother of Chetnik commander Pavle Đurišić. A 25 January 1943 document mentions Cali addressing Muslims in Gusinje not to attack local Serbs. In April 1944 Chetnik commanders reported to Mihailović that Prek Cali distinguished himself by supporting Chetniks, not only through providing Chetniks with accommodation in Vermosh but also through participation with a number of his men on Chetnik side in the campaign Chetniks undertook towards Andrijevica, sometimes with Vulnetari from Plav and Gusinje.

At the end of 1944 Prek Cali was a member of delegation sent by Đurišić to discuss with the Albanian fascist government over the safe retreat of Chetniks to Greece through Albania. When Mark Gjon appointed Prek Cali part of the Albanian delegation, Ljubomir Vuksanović jokingly remarked "take him from us, that is the best guarantee that all will go well".

Death 
By the end of the war, the main military and political force of the country, the Albanian Communist Partisans, concentrated towards the north of Albania in order to destroy the anti-Communist forces and to eliminate their rivals. They met an open resistance in Nikaj-Mërtur (now in Tropojë District), Dukagjin and Kelmend, whose chieftains were openly anti-Communists. On 15 January 1945, a battle between the 1st Brigade Partisans (supported later by the 23rd and 24th brigades plus Yugoslav Partisan forces) and anti-Communist forces was fought at the Tamara Bridge. The Partisans had 52 losses. About 150 Kelmendi people were killed. Their leader Prek Cali was surrounded in a cave in Vukël for a week, after which he surrendered. He was executed by the Communists on the feast day of Palm Sunday.

Legacy
After fall of communism in Albania, Prëk Cali was decorated and honored with the Medal "Martyr of Democracy" in 1993 by President of Albania Sali Berisha. Seven years later, in 2010, then-current President of Albania Bujar Nishani honored him with Order "Honor of Nation".<ref>{{citation| url=http://www.kosova.com/artikulli/96551| language=Albanian| access-date=2014-01-23| author=Frank Shkreli| title=Kelmendi, Nderi i Kombit| publisher=Kosova.com| trans-title=Kelmendi, Honor of the Nation| quote=Presidenti Nishani ia dorëzoi Këlmendit – fisit të luftëtarit legjendar Prek Cali - dekoratën Nderi i Kombit" gjatë aktivitetit artistik dhe kulturor (President Nishani handed over the decoration Honor of the Nation to the Kelemendi - tribe of legendary fighter Prek Cali)| archive-url=https://web.archive.org/web/20140202181330/http://www.kosova.com/artikulli/96551| archive-date=2 February 2014| url-status=dead}}</ref> In 2000 the monument of Prek Cali was set put in Shkodër.

 Controversy 
Mehdi Frashëri, the Prime Minister of Albania's Quisling government under Nazi Germany, believed that after Cali's death, Albanian and Yugoslav communists disseminated stories about Prëk Cali being a fascist, enemy of Albania, and secret supporter of Chetniks. Frashëri believed such accounts were untrue because Cali and his whole family fought together with the Kelmendi tribe against 800 Serbian partisans, and in August 1912 protected the northern borders of Albania. Luigj Martini also believes that the claims of cooperation between Chetniks and Cali is Albanian-Yugoslavian communist propaganda.

 Literature 
 
Mihailo Lalić (1914–1992) mentioned Cali in his short story Posljednje brdo (1967) and novel Pramen Tame'' (1979), and included him in his collection of memoirs.

References

Sources 
 
 
 
 
 
 
 

1878 births
1945 deaths
People from Malësi e Madhe
People from Scutari vilayet
Albanian Roman Catholics
Activists of the Albanian National Awakening
Albanian anti-communists
Albanian collaborators with Fascist Italy
Albanian collaborators with Nazi Germany
19th-century Albanian people
20th-century Albanian people
Albanian people executed by the communist regime
People killed by Yugoslav Partisans